Report Card for Parents was a DuMont Television Network panel discussion show on child behavior which aired Mondays at 8pm ET from December 1, 1952, to February 2, 1953.

Episode status
As with many DuMont series, no episodes are known to exist.

See also
List of programs broadcast by the DuMont Television Network
List of surviving DuMont Television Network broadcasts

References

Bibliography
David Weinstein, The Forgotten Network: DuMont and the Birth of American Television (Philadelphia: Temple University Press, 2004) 
Alex McNeil, Total Television, Fourth edition (New York: Penguin Books, 1980) 
Tim Brooks and Earle Marsh, The Complete Directory to Prime Time Network TV Shows, Third edition (New York: Ballantine Books, 1964)

External links
CTVA entry
DuMont historical website

DuMont Television Network original programming
1952 American television series debuts
1953 American television series endings
Black-and-white American television shows
1950s American game shows
Lost television shows